Slavic literature or Slavonic literature refers to the literature in any of the Slavic languages:

Belarusian literature
Bosnian literature
Bulgarian literature
Croatian literature
Czech literature
Kashubian literature
Macedonian literature
Polish literature
Russian literature
Serbian literature
Slovak literature
Slovene literature
Sorbian literature
Ukrainian literature
Outside the Russian literature, Slavic literature has been described as generally neglected in English literature studies and reference works.

See also
Slavic studies
Old Church Slavonic language

References 

European literature
Literature